The Spanish influence on Filipino culture has been profound, having originated from the Spanish East Indies, which was ruled from Mexico City and Madrid. A variety of aspects of the customs and traditions in the Philippines today can be traced back to Spanish and Novohispanic (Mexican) influence.

Background

Spanish settlement in the Philippines first took place in the 1500s, during the Spanish colonial period of the islands, which were ruled as a territory of New Spain (Mexico), until the independence of the Mexican empire in 1821; thereafter they were ruled from Spain itself. The conquistador Miguel López de Legazpi left New Spain and founded the first Spanish settlement in Cebu in 1565 and later established Manila as the capital of the Spanish East Indies in 1571. The Philippine Islands are named after King Philip.
Spaniards are referred to by Filipinos as "Kastila" (Castilian) named after the former Kingdom of Castile, now a region of Spain. The small population of Filipinos which have Spanish ancestry are descendants of people from Spain and New Spain (Mexico) who came during the colonial era.  Another term for them is Spanish Filipino.

History before Hispanization
Some of the societies scattered in the islands remained isolated but many evolved into states that developed substantial trade and contacts with the peoples of Eastern and Southern Asia, including those from India, China, Japan and other Austronesian islands (The Malay archipelago).

The 1st millennium saw the rise of the harbor principalities and their growth into maritime states composed of autonomous barangays independent of, or allied with larger nations which were either Malay thalassocracies, led by Datus or Indianized kingdoms governed by Rajahs.

Language

Philippine Spanish (Spanish: Español Filipino, Castellano Filipino) is a variant of standard Spanish spoken in the Philippines. It is a Spanish dialect of the Spanish language.

Chavacano, a Spanish-based creole, is spoken in the Zamboanga Peninsula (where it is an official language), Davao, and Cotabato in Mindanao, and Cavite in Luzon.

Filipinos today speak a variety of different languages including Cebuano, Tagalog, Ilocano, Ilonggo, and Bikolano, in addition to English—all of which are 90% Austronesian languages, and also contain up several Spanish loanwords. The Philippines still completely attained its entire languages and culture despite years of colonial rule.

The most common languages spoken in the Philippines today are English and Filipino, the national language that is a standardised form of Tagalog. Spanish was an official language of the country until immediately after the People Power Revolution in February 1986 and the subsequent ratification of the 1987 Constitution. The new charter dropped Spanish as an official language and today it is very rare to find a native Spanish speaker, less than 0.1% of the population.

However, the government of Gloria Macapagal Arroyo, the fourteenth president of the Philippines and a hispanophone, reintroduced the study of Spanish into the state school system.

Name of the Philippines

The name of the Philippines comes from the king of Spain Philip II. It was given by the Spanish explorer Ruy López de Villalobos who named the islands of Samar and Leyte "Las Islas Felipinas" (The Philippine Islands), during his expedition in 1543. Throughout the colonial period, the name Felipinas (Philippines) was used, and became the official name of the Philippines.

There are many provinces in the Philippines with Spanish names, such as Nueva Vizcaya, Nueva Écija (Nueva Ecija), Laguna, Isabela, Quirino, Aurora, La Unión (La Union), Marinduque, Antique, Negros Occidental, Negros Oriental, Nueva Segovia and Valle de Compostela.

Many cities and towns are also named in Spanish, such as Medellin, La Libertad, Naga, Camarines Sur (prior to 1919 was known as Nueva Cáceres), Las Piñas, Prosperidad, Isabela, Sierra Bullones, Angeles, La Paz, Esperanza, Buenavista, Pilar, La Trinidad, Garcia Hernandez, Trece Martires, Los Baños, and many more. There are numerous other towns and cities named after saints, such as San Fernando, Santa Rosa, San Isidro, San José, San Juan and San Pablo, as well as after Spanish places like Madrid, Santander, Toledo, Cádiz, Valencia, Murcia, Lucena, and Pamplona.

Other native Filipino names are spelled using Spanish orthography, such as Cagayán de Oro, Parañaque, and Cebú.

Filipino Spanish surnames

A Spanish or Latin-sounding surname does not necessarily denote Spanish ancestry in the Philippines. The names derive from the Spanish conquest of the Philippine Islands and its implementation of a Spanish naming system.

After the Spanish conquest of the Philippine islands, many early Christianized Filipinos assumed religious-instrument or saint names. This resulted in many people surnamed "de Los Santos" ("of the Saints"), "de la Cruz" ("of the Cross"), "del Rosario" ("of the Rosary"), "Bautista" ("Baptist"), and "de Jesus" ("of Jesus").

On November 21, 1849, the Spanish Governor-General of the Philippine Islands, Narciso Clavería, decreed the systematic distribution of surnames and the implementation of the Spanish naming system for the Filipinos. This produced the Catálogo alfabético de apellidos ("Alphabetical Catalogue of Surnames") listing Hispanicized Chinese and Filipino words, names, and numbers. Surnames of Spanish nobility and several colonial administrators, which include the preposition de as a nobiliary particle, were explicitly prohibited. Many names which resulted are not common to the Hispanophone world, because they were Hispanicized from the original Filipino or Chinese. This new naming system also did away with the Filipino custom of siblings taking different surnames.

People

Filipinos belong to the Austronesian ethnic group of the Southeast Asian region. The natives of the Philippine Islands may be related to the Chamorro people in the Mariana Islands (named Islas de Ladrones during Ferdinand Magellan's expedition) of the Pacific Ocean due to their racial similarity, and for being geographically not connected to the Southeast Asian mainland as a group of islands, but are rather different from the Pacific Islanders belonging to the Polynesian, Micronesian, and Melanesian ethnic groups. The natives of the Philippines are rather closely related to their closest neighbors, which are Malaysia and Indonesia. Most of the immigrant ethnicities of the Philippine Islands are from the Southeast Asian region. Although there are many ethnic groups in the Philippines, such as the native population (Tagalog, Bisaya, Bicolano, Ilocano, Mindanaoans, and the native Moros in Mindanao), that some people of the Philippines of this present time, consider them to be related to the Aborigines of Australia and Melanesians, are rather the result of the long period of interracial mixture among the native ethnic groups of the Islands. The Philippine Islands is still politically divided among the ethnic groups and regional groups, but there are also Chinese, Japanese, and Indian peoples who migrated after the Spanish colonial era and created their own non-native ethnic group. There are still a few Filipinos and prominent Filipino families today who are of pure Spanish ancestry.

Nevertheless, Stanford University had stated that only 1–3% of the Philippine population had minimal degrees of Spanish blood. The official percentage of Filipinos with Spanish ancestry is unknown. However, in a research done by Dr. Michael Purugganan, NYU Dean of Science in 2013, he conclude that Filipinos today are the conclusion of an Austronesian and Chinese migration result from thousands of years, a melting pot of Asia in pre-colonial era. He stated that; "We are all of many Indo-China mixes, and I think every Filipino who is genetically tested will show up as a mix. We are products of what we evolutionary genomicists call genetic admixture, the result of several thousand years of mixing in our island archipelago at the edge of the Pacific. We were always getting genes from everyone who came to our shores. We are, in a genetic sense, a truly global people."

Religion

The Philippines is one of two predominantly Christian countries in Asia, the other being East Timor. About 81% of the population is Catholic, 11% belong to Protestant or other Christian denominations, 5.6% are Muslim, and about 2% practice other religions or are irreligious.

Filipinos at home set up altars in the Hispanic tradition adorned with Catholic images, flowers, and candles. During fiestas, most communities organise church services and religious processions in honor of a patron saint, hold funfairs and concerts, and feast with a variety of Filipino foods.

Festivities

All major Christian holidays are observed as official national holidays in the Philippines. Spanish culture and Christianity has influenced the customs and traditions of the Philippines.

Every year on the 3rd Sunday of January, the Philippines celebrates the festival of the "Santo Niño" (Holy Child Jesus), the largest being held in Cebu City.

Holidays
January 1 – New Year's Day (Bagong Taon)
March or April – Semana Santa (Holy Week or Easter)
October 31 to November 2 – Day of the Dead, Araw ng mga Kaluluwa (All Souls' Day), and Todos Los Santos (All Saints' Day) where families spend much of the 3 days and 3 evenings visiting their ancestral graves, showing respect and honoring the departed relatives by feasting, decorating and offering prayers.
December 24 – Nochebuena (The Good night or Christmas Eve)
December 25 – Christmas (Pasko)

Arts, literature and music

Hispanic influence is based on Indigenous, and European tradition. Folk dance, music and literature have remained intact in the 21st century. These were introduced from Spain in the 16th century and can be regarded as largely Hispanic in the constitution, which has remained in the Philippines for centuries.

Cuisine

The cuisine in the Philippines reflects the influences of Spanish, Mexican and Asian cuisine.

They include:

Afritada
Albóndigas
Arroz a la valenciana
Arroz caldo
Bistek
Brazo de Mercedes
Caldereta
Champorado
Galantina
Chicharrón
Chorizo
Dulce de membrillo
Dulce de leche
Empanadas
Estufado
Ensaymadas
Escabeche
Espasol
Flan
Jamonada or Endulzado
Galletas
Jamón
Lechón
Longaniza
Lúgaw
Maíz con hielo
Mantequilla
Mazapán
Mechado
Menudo
Natilla
Paella
Pan de sal
Pastel de lengua
Pastillas de leche
Pescado
Picadillo
Pionono
Putsero
Polvorón
Quezo de Bola
Relleno
Tamale
Torta del cielo
Tortas
Tortilla quesada
Tocino
Tocino del cielo
Turrones de Casuy

Business

In the business community, the Philippine Chamber of Commerce and Industry (PCCI) plays an integral role in the economic, political and social development of the nation. Historically, the chamber can be traced back as early as the 1890s with the inauguration of the Cámara de Comercio de Filipinas. This organisation was composed mainly of Spanish companies such as the Compañia General de Tabacos de Filipinas, Fábrica de Cerveza San Miguel, and Elizalde y Cía, among other Spanish, and Philippine companies.

During the first half of the 20th-century commerce, and industrial trades with other Hispanic countries declined due to the United States administration of the Philippines and the Second World War. However, the resurgence of trade between Spain and Latin American nations had risen toward the closing of the century. 1998 marked the centennial celebration of Philippine independence and opened a new opportunity for both Hispanic and Filipino businesses to reconnect their historic ties as trade partners.

See also
Hispanic culture
Culture of the Philippines
Latin Union
Philippines education during Spanish rule

References

External links 

Spanish Philippines
Philippine culture
Philippines
History of the Philippines (1565–1898)
Philippines–Spain relations